Tomaso Armando Poggio (born 11 September 1947 in Genoa, Italy), is the Eugene McDermott professor in the Department of Brain and Cognitive Sciences, an investigator at the McGovern Institute for Brain Research, a member of the MIT Computer Science and Artificial Intelligence Laboratory (CSAIL) and director of both the Center for Biological and Computational Learning at MIT and the Center for Brains, Minds, and Machines, a multi-institutional collaboration headquartered at the McGovern Institute since 2013.

Biography 
Born in Genoa, Italy, and educated at Istituto Arecco, Tomaso Poggio completed his doctorate in physics at the University of Genoa and received his degree in Theoretical Physics under professor A. Borsellino.

Research
His interdisciplinary research on the problem of intelligence, between brains and computers, started at the Max Planck Institute in Tübingen, Germany in collaborations with Werner E. Reichardt, David C. Marr and Francis H.C. Crick, among others. He has made contributions to learning theory, to the computational theory of vision, to the understanding of the fly's visual system, and to the biophysics of computation. His recent work is focused on computational neuroscience in close collaboration with several physiology labs, trying to answer the questions of how our visual system learns to see and recognize scenes and objects.

He is one of the most cited computational neuroscientists.  with contributions ranging from the biophysical and behavioral studies of the visual system to the computational analyses of vision and learning in humans and machines. With Werner E. Reichardt he characterized quantitatively the visuo-motor control system in the fly.  With David Marr (neuroscientist), he introduced the seminal idea of levels of analysis in computational neuroscience. He and Torre introduced regularization as a mathematical framework to approach the ill-posed problems of vision and the key problem of learning from data. The citation for the 2009 Okawa prize mentions his  “…outstanding contributions to the establishment of computational neuroscience, and pioneering researches ranging from the biophysical and behavioral studies of the visual system to the computational analysis of vision and learning in humans and machines.”  His research has always been interdisciplinary, between brains and computers. It is now focused on the mathematics of deep learning and on the computational neuroscience of the visual cortex.

Industry
Poggio is a former Corporate Fellow of Thinking Machines Corporation and a former director of PHZ Capital Partners, Inc., is a director of Mobileye and was involved in starting, or investing in, several other high tech companies including Arris Pharmaceutical, nFX, Imagen, Digital Persona and DeepMind. Among his PhD students and post-docs are some of the today's leaders in the Science and in the Engineering of Intelligence,  from Christof Koch (President and Chief Scientific Officer, Allen Institute) to Amnon Shashua (CTO and founder, Mobileye) and Demis Hassabis (CEO and founder, Deep Mind).

Honors and awards
Poggio is an honorary member of the Neuroscience Research Program, a member of the American Academy of Arts and Sciences and a founding fellow of AAAI and a founding member of the McGovern Institute for Brain Research. He received the Laurea Honoris Causa in Computer Engineering from the University of Pavia for the Volta Bicentennial in 2000, the 2003 Gabor Award, the 2009 Okawa Prize , and named in 2009 a Fellow of the American Association for the Advancement of Science (AAAS) for “distinguished contributions to computational neuroscience, in particular, computational vision learning and regularization theory, biophysics of computation and models of recognition in the visual cortex”, the 2014 Swartz Prize for Theoretical and Computational Neuroscience, in 2020 won the first edition of the international scientific award "Ratio et spes", the ICCV 2021 Helmholtz Prize, and the Kampe’ de F’eriet Award and Plenary Lecture, IMPU 2022, Milan, Italy.

Notable students

Christof Koch, President and Chief Scientific Officer, Allen Institute for Brain Science
Amnon Shashua, CTO and founder, Mobileye
Demis Hassabis, CEO and founder of Google DeepMind

See also
 Center for Brains, Minds, and Machines
 Center for Biological and Computational Learning at MIT.

References

External links
The Center for Biological and Computational Learning (CBCL) at MIT
McGovern Institute for Brain Research at MIT

Massachusetts Institute of Technology School of Science faculty
Artificial intelligence researchers
Italian cognitive neuroscientists
Fellows of the Association for the Advancement of Artificial Intelligence
Fellows of the American Academy of Arts and Sciences
Living people
1947 births
University of Genoa alumni
Italian computer scientists
American computer scientists
Computer vision researchers